Michael Paul Burkard is an American poet.

Life
He graduated from Hobart College in 1968 and from the Iowa Writers' Workshop with an MFA in 1973. He taught at Kirkland College (1975–78) and Sarah Lawrence College (1983–84, 1986–87), and has taught in the M.F.A. Program in Creative Writing at Syracuse University since 1997. He has been a visiting writer at New York University (1991) and the University of Louisville (1992, 1996), as well as a writer-in-residence at Austin Peay State University (1990).

His poems have appeared in American Poetry Review, The Paris Review, Ploughshares, APR, Ironwood and Quarterly West.

Awards
2008 Guggenheim Fellow
 1984, 1985, and 1999 Jerome J. Shestack Poetry Award, from American Poetry Review
 1986 Denise and Mel Cohen Award, from Ploughshares
 1988 Whiting Award
 two NEA grants
 Alice Fay Di Castagnola Award from the Poetry Society of America
 1978-79 Fine Arts Work Center in Provincetown Fellowship
 1982 MacDowell Colony Fellowship
 two New York Foundation for the Arts grants

Works
"Copy Book", The Marlboro Review
"Cherry Eye", American Poetry Review

Anthologies

Ploughshares

Reviews
Michael Burkard's latest book — full of revenants, revisitations, and regrets — is similarly lingering and resonant. Fifteen years passed between the writing of the poems that became Pennsylvania Collection Agency and their publication as a cohesive collection by New Issues, yet they're not dated.

References

External links
Audio: Michael Burkard reads "The Eyeglasses" from My Secret Boat (1990)
Profile at The Whiting Foundation

1947 births
Living people
20th-century American poets
Hobart and William Smith Colleges alumni
Iowa Writers' Workshop alumni
New York University faculty
Sarah Lawrence College faculty
University of Louisville faculty
Syracuse University faculty
21st-century American poets